This is a list of members of the South Australian House of Assembly from 1956 to 1959, as elected at the 1956 state election:

 The LCL member for Wallaroo, Leslie Heath, died on 16 July 1957. Labor candidate Lloyd Hughes won the resulting by-election on 3 August 1957.
 The Independent member for Mount Gambier, John Fletcher, died on 5 June 1958. Labor candidate Ron Ralston won the resulting by-election on 12 July 1958.
 The Labor member for Port Pirie, Charles Davis, died on 27 January 1959. No by-election was held due to the imminent 1959 state election.

Members of South Australian parliaments by term
20th-century Australian politicians